Adeel Husain is a Pakistani actor and director. 

He is best known for his roles in Daasi, Mata-e-Jaan Hai Tu, Mohabat Subh Ka Sitara Hai, Jackson Heights and Mera Naseeb.

Early life and education
Born on 30 June 1978 in Karachi, he earned his Masters in marketing from Dublin, Ireland.

Career

Acting 
Already having painting and drawing as hobbies, he started his career in the 1990s, became a part of the City FM'''s breakfast show and made appearances on the screen in the form of advertisements, selective TV dramas, music videos, and telefilms like Duniya Goal Hai that ran in Kara Film Festival. 
 Direction 
His first work as director was a car commercial in 2008 for the HBL Car to Car campaign and an unreleased brand entertainment project for the Telecom sector by the name of Mera Mobile which he created and directed. He also worked as a cinematographer in a documentary produced by Vizor Studios''.

Filmography

Television

Films 
| Denotes films that have not yet been released

Awards and nominations

References

External links 
 
 

Pakistani male film actors
1978 births
Living people
Alumni of Dublin Business School